The Chinamita or Tulumkis (Nahuatl chinamitl, Mopan tulumki) were a Mopan Maya people who occupied a territory in the eastern Petén Basin and western Belize between the Itza of Nojpetén, within the borders of modern Guatemala, and their allies at Tipuj, now in Belize. In the early 17th century, the Chinamita probably occupied a territory along the Mopan River south of the Yaxhá and Sacnab lakes in Petén, and in neighbouring portions of Belize. In 1698, after the fall of Nojpetén to the Spanish, the Itza told the Spanish that the Chinamita had territory nine days to the east of the Itza capital.

Etymology
The term Chinamita is derived from the Nahuatl chinamitl, meaning "cane hedge". This was equivalent to the Mopan term tulum ki, meaning "wall of agave", which was the name of the Chinamita capital. Spanish chronicler Juan de Villagutierre Soto-Mayor described the Chinamita and Tulunquies as two distinct peoples; however, chinamitl is merely the Nahuatl translation of the Maya tulumki.

Settlements
The Chinamitas' principal settlement was a town called Tulumki, and the Chinamita people were also referred to as Tulumkis or Tulunquies. Tulumki was said to have a population of 8,000 in the early 17th century; the population was said to include both male and female Spaniards who had been captured by the Chinamitas. The town was described as being defended by a moat and a maguey hedge, and was accessed via a narrow entranceway.

Relations with the Itza
The Chinamita were hostile towards their Itza neighbours and their allies. In 1618, Itza warriors informed the Franciscan missionaries Bartolomé de Fuensalida and Juan de Orbita that they always travelled armed when visiting their allies in Tipuj, for fear of encountering their fierce Chinamita enemies. According to Fuensalida, the Chinamita had a reputation for being cannibals. When Franciscan friar Andrés de Avendaño y Loyola visited the Itza in 1696, he understood the Tuluncies formed a part of the Itza kingdom.

Notes

Notes

References

 
 
 
 

Maya peoples
Indigenous peoples in Belize
History of Petén
Former indigenous peoples in Guatemala
Maya Postclassic Period
Maya Contact Period